The Grand River Bridge is a historic bridge located west of Leon, Iowa, United States. A 7-panel Pratt Pony truss spans the main channel of the river, with a 4-panel Pratt pony truss/bedstead and timber stringer that forms the approach span on the west side. It was built by bridge contractors Daniel and Webster for $2,980 and completed in 1890. The bridge is no longer in use for vehicular traffic. It was listed on the National Register of Historic Places in 1998.

See also
List of bridges documented by the Historic American Engineering Record in Iowa

References

External links

Bridges completed in 1890
Transportation buildings and structures in Decatur County, Iowa
Road bridges on the National Register of Historic Places in Iowa
Truss bridges in Iowa
Historic American Engineering Record in Iowa
National Register of Historic Places in Decatur County, Iowa
Pratt truss bridges in the United States
Metal bridges in the United States